Norwich is an unincorporated community in Tarkio Township, Page County, Iowa, United States.

History
Founded in the 1800s, Norwich's population was 88 in 1902, and 70 in 1925.

References

Unincorporated communities in Page County, Iowa
Unincorporated communities in Iowa